Thomas John Mitchell (July 11, 1892 – December 17, 1962) was an American actor and writer. Among his most famous roles in a long career are those of Gerald O'Hara in Gone with the Wind, Doc Boone in Stagecoach, Uncle Billy in It's a Wonderful Life, Pat Garrett in The Outlaw, and Mayor Jonas Henderson in High Noon. Mitchell was the first male actor to gain the Triple Crown of Acting by winning an Oscar, an Emmy, and a Tony Award.

Mitchell was nominated for two Academy Awards, for Best Supporting Actor for his work in the films, The Hurricane (1937), and Stagecoach (1939), winning for the latter. He was nominated three times for the Primetime Emmy Award for Best Actor in a Drama Series in 1952 and 1953, for his role in the medical drama The Doctor, and won in 1953. While he was nominated again in 1955, for an appearance on a weekly anthology series, he did not win. Mitchell won the Tony Award for Best Actor in a Musical, in 1953, for his role as Dr Downer in the musical comedy Hazel Flagg, based on the 1937 screwball comedy film Nothing Sacred, rounding out the Triple Crown of Acting. In addition to being an actor, he was also a director, playwright, and screenwriter.

Early life
Mitchell was born to Irish immigrants in Elizabeth, New Jersey. He came from a family of journalists and civic leaders. Both his father and brother were newspaper reporters, and his nephew, James P. Mitchell, later served as Dwight Eisenhower's Secretary of Labor. In the 1952 presidential election, Mitchell, a Republican, supported Eisenhower's campaign. The younger Mitchell also became a newspaper reporter after graduating from St. Patrick High School in Elizabeth. However, Mitchell soon found that he enjoyed writing  theatrical skits much more than chasing scoops. In 1927 Mitchell joined The Lambs.

Acting career

He became an actor in 1913, at one point touring with Charles Coburn's Shakespeare Company. Even while playing leading roles on Broadway into the 1920s Mitchell would continue to write. One of the plays he co-authored, Little Accident, was eventually made into a film (three times) by Hollywood. Mitchell's first credited screen role was in the 1923 film Six Cylinder Love. Mitchell's breakthrough role was as the embezzler in Frank Capra's film Lost Horizon (1937).

Following this performance, he was much in demand in Hollywood.  That same year, he was nominated for the Academy Award for Best Supporting Actor for his performance in The Hurricane, directed by John Ford.

Over the next few years, Mitchell appeared in many significant films. Forty-three of the fifty-nine films in which he acted were made in the 10-year period from 1936 to 1946. Considered one of the finest character actors in film, in 1939 alone he had key roles in Stagecoach, Mr. Smith Goes to Washington, Only Angels Have Wings, The Hunchback of Notre Dame, and Gone with the Wind. While probably better remembered as Scarlett O'Hara's loving but doomed father in Gone with the Wind, it was for his performance as the drunken Doc Boone in Stagecoach, co-starring John Wayne (in Wayne's breakthrough role), that Mitchell won the Best Supporting Actor Academy Award. In his acceptance speech, he quipped, "I didn't know I was that good". Throughout the 1940s and 1950s, Mitchell acted in a wide variety of roles in productions such as 1940's Swiss Family Robinson, 1942's Moontide, 1944's The Keys of the Kingdom (as an atheist doctor) and High Noon (1952) as the town mayor. He is probably best known to audiences today for his role as sad sack Uncle Billy in Capra's Christmas classic It's a Wonderful Life (1946) with James Stewart.

From the 1950s and into the early 1960s, Mitchell worked primarily in television, appearing in a variety of roles in some of the most well-regarded early series of the era, including Playhouse 90, Dick Powell's Zane Grey Theater (in a pilot episode that became the CBS series Johnny Ringo), and Hallmark Hall of Fame productions. In 1954, he starred in the television version of the radio program, Mayor of the Town. In 1955, he played Kris Kringle in The 20th Century-Fox Hour version of The Miracle on 34th Street opposite Teresa Wright and MacDonald Carey. In 1957 he hosted  The O. Henry Playhouse. In 1959, he starred in thirty-nine episodes of the syndicated television series, Glencannon, which had aired two years earlier in the United Kingdom.

In the early 1960s, Mitchell originated the stage role "Columbo", later made famous on NBC and ABC television by Peter Falk (Bert Freed played the part on live television before Mitchell portrayed Columbo on stage); Columbo was Mitchell's last role.

Death
Mitchell died at age 70 from peritoneal mesothelioma in Beverly Hills, California. He was cremated at the Chapel of the Pines Crematory and his ashes are in vaultage.

Work

Films

Writer
 Little Accident (1928) – play Little Accident
 Papa Sans le Savoir (1932) – play Little Accident
 All of Me (1934) - Dialogue Director
 All of Me (1934) - Screenplay
 Life Begins with Love (1937) - Screenplay
 Little Accident (1939) – play Little Accident
 Casanova Brown (1944) – play Little Accident
 Peter's Baby (1961) – play Little Accident (uncredited)

Television

Theatre 

Staged by

Radio

Awards and nominations
In 1953, Mitchell became the first man to win the "triple crown" of acting awards (Oscar, Emmy, Tony). He remains one of only a handful of individuals to have won each of these awards. 

He has two stars on the Hollywood Walk of Fame, one for his work in television at 6100 Hollywood Boulevard, and a second star for his work in motion pictures at 1651 Vine Street.

See also

 List of actors with Academy Award nominations

References

Further reading

External links

 
 
 
 Photos of Thomas Mitchell from 'Stagecoach' by Ned Scott

1892 births
1962 deaths
American male film actors
American male stage actors
American male television actors
Best Supporting Actor Academy Award winners
Broadway theatre directors
Broadway theatre producers
Burials at Chapel of the Pines Crematory
Donaldson Award winners
Outstanding Performance by a Lead Actor in a Miniseries or Movie Primetime Emmy Award winners
American people of Irish descent
Male actors from New Jersey
Actors from Elizabeth, New Jersey
The Patrick School alumni
Tony Award winners
Deaths from cancer in California
Deaths from bone cancer
20th-century American male actors
American male musical theatre actors
20th-century American dramatists and playwrights
American male screenwriters
American theatre directors
American male dramatists and playwrights
20th-century American male writers
New Jersey Republicans
California Republicans
Screenwriters from New York (state)
Screenwriters from New Jersey
20th-century American male singers
20th-century American singers
20th-century American screenwriters